Peter Tsepo Masilela (born 5 May 1985) is a South African professional footballer who last played as a left back for AmaZulu. He represented the South Africa national team.

Early career
Masilela first played amateur soccer for local team, Manchester and later the Disco Makua Academy which was run by former Witbank Aces player Steve Makua who is the father of Frank Makua who played for Kaizer Chiefs. He then moved to Vodacom League club, Sonas Mpumalanga.

Club career
Such was his meteoric rise Masilela made his full international debut before making his Premier Soccer League debut. In the same vein, after only one season in top-flight football in his home country, he made the move to Israeli club Maccabi Haifa.

Maccabi Haifa
Masilela signed a four-year contract with Maccabi Haifa on 31 August 2007. He was a crucial part of Maccabi Haifa winning the Israeli Championship, and qualifying for the UEFA Champions League. Masilela made 13 assists and one goal in the 2009–10 season. In June 2011, he extended his contract with a two-year deal.

Getafe
On 20 August 2011, Masilela joined the Spanish La Liga club Getafe on a season-long loan deal from Maccabi Haifa. He returned to Maccabi Haifa after the expiry of his loan deal with Getafe.

Kaizer Chiefs
Masilela returned to South Africa after five years overseas to sign for Kaizer Chiefs in mid-2012. He made his debut in November 2012 in a 3–2 win over Moroka Swallows.

International career
Masilela was the first player to be called up while campaigning in the National First Division. Since 2006 he has played for South Africa, participating in the 2006 African Nations Cup, 2008 African Nations Cup, the 2009 FIFA Confederations Cup, the 2010 FIFA World Cup and the 2013 African Nations Cup.

Personal life
His father, Eric Masilela is a Witbank Aces legend having played with the likes of Lawrence Siyangaphi, Harris Chueu, Steve Makua and Thomas Ngobe, father of Dumisa Ngobe. He is paternal half-brother of Innocent Maela.

Honours
Maccabi Haifa
 Israeli Premier League: 2008–09, 2010–11
 Toto Cup: 2007–08

References

External links
 Getafe official profile 
 2010 FIFA World Cup profile
 
 
 

1985 births
Living people
People from Witbank
South African soccer players
Association football defenders
Hellenic F.C. players
Thanda Royal Zulu F.C. players
Maccabi Haifa F.C. players
La Liga players
Getafe CF footballers
Kaizer Chiefs F.C. players
AmaZulu F.C. players
South Africa international soccer players
2009 FIFA Confederations Cup players
2006 Africa Cup of Nations players
2008 Africa Cup of Nations players
2010 FIFA World Cup players
2013 Africa Cup of Nations players
South African expatriate soccer players
Expatriate footballers in Israel
South African expatriate sportspeople in Israel
Expatriate footballers in Spain
South African expatriate sportspeople in Spain
South Africa A' international soccer players
2014 African Nations Championship players